Joachim Andre Henry is a Saint Lucian politician and Minister for Equity, Social Justice and Empowerment, he was elected to represent Castries South East constituency in the House of Assembly in the 2021 general election.  He is a member of the Saint Lucia Labour Party.  From 2016 to 2020, he served in the Senate as leader of opposition business.

Henry unsuccessfully contested the Castries South East seat in the 2016 general election.

References 

Living people

Members of the Senate of Saint Lucia
Saint Lucia Labour Party politicians
Year of birth missing (living people)
21st-century Saint Lucian politicians